Lourdes Domínguez Lino (born 31 March 1981) is a retired tennis player from Spain. She reached career-high rankings of world No. 40 in singles and 45 in doubles.

Tennis career
In the 1999 Roland Garros, she won the junior girls' singles, defeating Stéphanie Foretz in the final.

In 2000, she played her first WTA Tour main draw at Madrid. In 2002, she won her first main draw match at Bogotá. In Porto, she defeated then-No. 33 Cristina Torrens Valero. In August, Lino was suspended from the tour for three months, after testing positive for cocaine that March.

In 2005, she reached the top 100 for the first time. In Bogotá she made it to the final as a qualifier, losing to Flavia Pennetta. She ended at No. 77 in the world in singles and No. 63 in doubles.

She won her first WTA title in Bogotá by defeating No. 18 Flavia Pennetta. She reached the final of Budapest, losing to Anna Smashnova, and ended the year at No. 52 in singles.

In 2007, she reached the semifinals at Bogotá and the quarterfinals at Estoril, Palermo, and Bad Gastein. She ended at No. 72 in the world in singles.

In 2011, she won her second WTA Tour title, defeating Mathilde Johansson at Bogotá in the final. After this, she reached quarterfinals at Acapulco.

In November 2016, she announced her retirement from professional tennisn.

Grand Slam performance timelines

Singles

Doubles

WTA career finals

Singles: 5 (2 titles, 3 runner-ups)

Doubles: 13 (6 titles, 7 runner-ups)

ITF Circuit finals

Singles: 30 (17 titles, 13 runner-ups)

Doubles: 59 (36 titles, 23 runner-ups)

See also
 List of sportspeople sanctioned for doping offences

Notes

References

External links

 
 
 

1981 births
Living people
Sportspeople from Pontevedra
Spanish female tennis players
Doping cases in tennis
Grand Slam (tennis) champions in girls' singles
Spanish sportspeople in doping cases
Mediterranean Games silver medalists for Spain
Mediterranean Games bronze medalists for Spain
Mediterranean Games medalists in tennis
Competitors at the 2001 Mediterranean Games
French Open junior champions
20th-century Spanish women
21st-century Spanish women